Dual is an EP released in July 2013 by British electronic music singer, songwriter and producer Sampha from Morden, South London, United Kingdom.

Critical reception

Dual received positive reviews from most music critics. Zach Kelly of Pitchfork Media stated, "For someone so willing to lay himself this bare as a first impression is rare, but in terms of the music found on 'Dual', nothing could be more natural."

Track listing

Personnel
Sampha - Composer, Mixing, Primary Artist, Producer
Ben Walker - Artwork

References

2013 EPs
Sampha albums
Young Turks (record label) albums